Vohitany is a town and commune in southwestern Madagascar. It belongs to the district of Ampanihy, which is a part of Atsimo-Andrefana Region. The population of the commune was estimated to be approximately 10,000 in 2001 commune census.

Only primary schooling is available. It is also a site of industrial-scale  mining. The majority 70% of the population of the commune are farmers, while an additional 20% receives their livelihood from raising livestock. The most important crops are cassava and peanuts, while other important agricultural products are sweet potatoes and rice.  Industry and services provide employment for 1% and 9% of the population, respectively.

References and notes 

Populated places in Atsimo-Andrefana